The Parisian Macao is a casino resort on the Cotai Strip in Cotai, Macau, China owned by Las Vegas Sands, which features a half-scale Eiffel Tower as one its landmarks. It was originally expected to be operational in late 2015, with that later changed to August 2016. The hotel officially opened on 13 September 2016.

History

Development and construction

The Parisian Macao was estimated to cost around $2.5 billion and is being funded by Las Vegas Sands with $1.5 billion in bank loans and $900 million to $1 billion in cash. The company will also have to pay a penalty of 900,000 patacas ($112,700) for the delay in developing the plot.

Construction began in February 2013.

Opening (2016) 
Originally expected to be operational in late 2015, the completion of The Parisian Macao was delayed and finally opened in September 2016. However, its launch quarter results were below expectations.

Downsizing (2019) 
In 2019, 600 rooms in The Parisian Macao were renovated to become 300 new suites to meet rising demands. This brings the total room count from the original 3,000 rooms and suites to approximately 2,700.

Design
The Parisian Macao features a half-scale 525-foot Eiffel Tower as one of its landmarks.

The property has approximately 2,700 hotel rooms, 170 shops and 56,000 square feet of meeting space. In addition, the resort features a 1,200-seat theatre. For the first month of the hotel's opening, the theatre hosted Thriller Live, and hopes to attract more Broadway and West End performances.

The interior has a large fountain and atrium giving a feel of modern France. There are 150 gaming tables allotted to the property, of which 100 were allotted at launch and the next 50 will be allotted over the next years.

Shops in the retail arcade, Shoppes at Parisian include Adidas, Calvin Klein and Breitling.

Transportation

Bus 
There are several shuttle bus services connecting The Parisian Macao to Macau's major ports of entry and nearby resorts. These shuttle services are provided free of charge. However, due to the COVID-19 pandemic, some services are temporarily not in operation.

 The Parisian Macao to The Londoner Macao and Border Gate
 The Parisian Macao to Hengqin Port
 The Parisian Macao to Sands Macao
 The Parisian Macao to The Venetian Macao and Taipa Ferry Terminal

Macau Light Rapid Transit 

The Parisian Macao is within walking distance from Cotai West Station on the Taipa section of the Macau Light Rapid Transit that serves the Cotai Strip and the larger area of Cotai.

Gallery

See also
 Gambling in Macau 
List of properties on the Cotai Strip
List of tallest buildings in Macau
 List of Macau casinos
List of largest hotels
Paris Las Vegas - similarly themed hotel in Las Vegas, Nevada, United States.

References

External links

Official website

Hotels in Macau
Casinos in Macau
Cotai
Casino hotels
Hotels established in 2016
Casinos completed in 2016
Eiffel Tower reproductions
2016 establishments in Macau